Bonneville County is a county located in the U.S. state of Idaho. As of the 2020 census, the county had a population of 123,964, making it the fourth-most populous county in Idaho and the most populous in eastern Idaho. Its county seat and largest city is Idaho Falls. Bonneville County was established in 1911 and named after Benjamin Bonneville (1796–1878), a French-born officer in the U.S. Army, fur trapper, and explorer in the American West. Benjamin was the son of Nicholas Bonneville of France, an Illuminati member who had written the "Illuminati Manifesto for World Revolution" in 1792, which played a significant role in the French revolution. Bonneville County is part of the Idaho Falls Metropolitan Statistical Area.

History

Bonneville County was established February 7, 1911, by the state legislature from the north and east parts of Bingham County, Idaho. It was named for Capt. B.L.E. Bonneville, of the U.S. Army, who explored throughout the Snake River area in the 1830s. A settlement developed at the site of the Idaho Falls, Idaho ferry on the Snake River in 1864. This settlement was to be known as Idaho Falls after 1891.

Today, Bonneville County stretches up from two desert floors through a fertile valley of plush crops and into heavily forested peaks. The area that became Bonneville County was first associated with Oneida County which stretched through most of southern and southeastern Idaho. It was later reapportioned and formed the northern end of Bingham County. It wasn't until 1911 that Bonneville County was formed and Idaho Falls became the County seat. During all of this time, and even before people started making boundaries and setting up towns, villages and governments, there was a rich part to the region. Indians roamed much of the county in travels to Camas Harvest, and in 1808 John Corter came through the area. In 1810, Major Andrew Henry saw the country, and in 1832, the man whose name was later to be immortalized by the institution of the county, Captain B.L.E. Bonneville, visited the area.

The first bona fide town in the county, Keenan, was in the extreme eastern portion of Bonneville County near Caribou Mountain. Keenan boasted a population of nearly 1,000 people. It was about this same time, 1870, that Caribou City also sprang up and Eagle Rock, the forerunner of present-day Idaho Falls, began to acquire a population. There was a time during this growth and settlement period when it appeared Caribou City would outgrow Eagle Rock.

The gold rush into the Caribou region was not considered a small one despite the brevity of the settlements. An estimated $50 million was taken out of the region in gold dust and nuggets. Aside from the gold on Caribou mountain, cattle raising was the first major industry. Before the coming of the railroad, Matt Taylor bought and trailed a herd of cattle into the valley. As more settlers came they too started herds and stock raising became a profitable, growing industry.

Experiments proved that many farm products could be raised in the area and farms spread over the valley. In 1888, a group of farmers planted small acreages of potatoes. That fall they sold them for 90 cents per hundred weight, and a new industry was created. During the early 20th century, more experiments had shown that sugar beets could be grown successfully. In 1902, Mark Austin surveyed the possibilities and recommended that a sugar factory be built east of Idaho Falls. In 1903 the cornerstone for the building was laid. That fall the factory was in production and the small town of Lincoln built up around it.

From the building of the ferry in 1863 to 1900 the face of Bonneville County changed considerably. The Utah and Northern Railroad Company made Eagle Rock a division point, built maintenance shops and the town grew. In 1885, Eagle Rock had a population of 1,500. In 1887 the railroad shops moved to Pocatello, leaving Eagle Rock almost a ghost town. With the development of irrigation, the town took on a new life and it became the most important shipping point between Ogden, Utah and Butte, Montana.

Idaho Falls
On August 26, 1891, the name of Eagle Rock was changed to Idaho Falls due to the cataract in the river on the west edge of the city. The town became a city on April 6, 1900, with Joseph A. Clark as its first Mayor. Idaho Falls was on its way and headed for a future that would one day see it as headquarters for an atomic energy installation; but in the year of 1900, it was still a city under the control of Blackfoot. Blackfoot was the county seat of Bingham County which still harbored Idaho Falls and it was to be 11 years before Idaho Falls became the county seat.

Geography
The Snake River flows northwest through the Bonneville County, beginning at the Wyoming border as the Palisades Reservoir. The river exits the county about midway on its northern border, turns and re-enters approximately 20 miles (32 km) west to flow southwest through Idaho Falls .

Adjacent counties
Madison County - north
Teton County - north
Teton County, Wyoming - northeast
Lincoln County, Wyoming - southeast
Caribou County - south
Bingham County - west
Jefferson County - northwest

Major highways
 - Interstate 15
 - US 20
 - US 26
 - US 91
 - SH-31
 - SH-43

National protected areas
 Caribou National Forest (part)
 Grays Lake National Wildlife Refuge (part)
 Targhee National Forest (part)

Demographics

2000 census
As of the census of 2000, there were 82,522 people, 28,753 households, and 21,449 families living in the county. There were 30,484 housing units at an average density of 16 per square mile (6/km2). The racial makeup of the county was 92.79% White, 0.49% Black or African American, 0.65% Native American, 0.82% Asian, 0.07% Pacific Islander, 3.72% from other races, and 1.46% from two or more races. 6.91% of the population were Hispanic or Latino of any race. 25.3% were of English, 14.3% German and 12.2% American ancestry.

There were 28,753 households, out of which 40.60% had children under the age of 18 living with them, 62.00% were married couples living together, 9.30% had a female householder with no husband present, and 25.40% were non-families. 21.40% of all households were made up of individuals, and 7.80% had someone living alone who was 65 years of age or older. The average household size was 2.83 and the average family size was 3.33.

In the county, the population was spread out, with 32.10% under the age of 18, 9.50% from 18 to 24, 27.20% from 25 to 44, 21.00% from 45 to 64, and 10.20% who were 65 years of age or older. The median age was 32 years. For every 100 females there were 99.40 males. For every 100 females age 18 and over, there were 96.20 males.

The median income for a household in the county was $41,805, and the median income for a family was $48,216. Males had a median income of $38,745 versus $22,514 for females. The per capita income for the county was $18,326. About 7.40% of families and 10.10% of the population were below the poverty line, including 12.20% of those under age 18 and 5.90% of those age 65 or over.

2010 census
As of the 2010 United States Census, there were 104,234 people, 36,629 households, and 26,787 families living in the county. The racial makeup of the county was 90.6% white, 0.8% Asian, 0.8% American Indian, 0.6% black or African American, 0.1% Pacific islander, 5.1% from other races, and 2.1% from two or more races. Those of Hispanic or Latino origin made up 11.4% of the population. In terms of ancestry, 23.4% were English, 17.4% were German, 9.9% were American, and 7.8% were Irish.

Of the 36,629 households, 40.4% had children under the age of 18 living with them, 58.7% were married couples living together, 10.1% had a female householder with no husband present, 26.9% were non-families, and 22.4% of all households were made up of individuals. The average household size was 2.81 and the average family size was 3.32. The median age was 31.7 years.

The median income for a household in the county was $50,445 and the median income for a family was $58,346. Males had a median income of $46,498 versus $29,008 for females. The per capita income for the county was $23,218. About 8.1% of families and 11.0% of the population were below the poverty line, including 13.9% of those under age 18 and 6.6% of those age 65 or over.

Communities

Cities
Ammon
Idaho Falls
Iona
Irwin
Ririe (partially)
Swan Valley
Ucon

Census-designated place
Lincoln

Unincorporated communities
Beachs Corner
Bone
Osgood
Palisades

Ghost towns
Herman
Caribou City

Politics
Like most of Idaho, Bonneville County has been powerfully Republican for many decades. The last Democratic nominee to win it was Harry Truman in 1948. It is very conservative for an urban county; underlining this, Lyndon Johnson is the last Democrat to manage even 40 percent of the county’s vote.

See also
National Register of Historic Places listings in Bonneville County, Idaho

References

External links
County website

 

 
Idaho counties
1911 establishments in Idaho
Populated places established in 1911
Idaho Falls metropolitan area counties